Patriarch Nicephorus I may refer to:

 Nikephoros I of Constantinople, Ecumenical Patriarch in 806–815
 Nicephorus II of Constantinople, Ecumenical Patriarch in 1260–1261
 Patriarch Nicephorus of Alexandria, Greek Patriarch of Alexandria in 1639–1645